Jeremy Zuckerman (born July 31, 1975) is an American composer of concert music, film and television music, music for modern dance, and experimental music.  He is best known as the composer for the animated series Avatar: The Last Airbender and its sequel series The Legend of Korra.

Background
At age five, Zuckerman began learning piano with his mother as his teacher. As a teenager and into his early 20s, he played guitar and synthesizer in heavy metal and coldwave bands. Zuckerman studied jazz and computer music at the Berklee College of Music, where he earned a bachelor's degree. He earned a master's degree at the California Institute of the Arts, where he studied modern composition with a focus on computer music and sonic art with Morton Subotnick, Mark Trayle, and Tom Erbe.

Career

Film/TV 
Zuckerman began his career as a television/film composer as one half of The Track Team, a music and sound design company based in Los Angeles. He started The Track Team in 2004 with co-founder Benjamin Wynn ( Deru). Zuckerman created the music for the critically acclaimed television series, Avatar: The Last Airbender, which won a Peabody Award in 2008. Zuckerman also composed the music for the Avatar sequel series, The Legend of Korra. Zuckerman's music is also featured in DC's The Spectre, Jonah Hex, Green Arrow, and Superman/Shazam!: The Return of Black Adam.

Together, Zuckerman and Wynn created the music for the feature films Just Peck and A Leading Man, and the Nickelodeon TV series Kung Fu Panda: Legends of Awesomeness.

In 2017, after two Emmy Award wins and five nominations, Zuckerman and Wynn announced the dissolution of The Track Team to pursue their creative and professional paths independently.

Zuckerman went on to score the first three seasons of MTV and VH1's Scream, as well as the PBS documentaries Nature: Snow Monkeys and Nature: Yosemite. Other documentaries include Beartrek, Stuntman, and This Little Land of Mines.

Most recently Zuckerman, along with Josiah Steinbrick, composed the score for the new Jeff Baena film Horse Girl.

The Echo Society/Concert Music 
Zuckerman is a founding member of The Echo Society, a Los Angeles-based collective whose mission is to gather, inspire, enrich and connect the community through the creation and performance of new sonic and visual art. The Echo Society's other founding members include composers Brendan Angelides (aka Eskmo), Judson Crane, Nathan Johnson, Rob Simonsen, Joseph Trapanese, and Benjamin Wynn.

Zuckerman's music for The Echo Society concert series is predominantly chamber music, and the work "focuses on creating highly specific and controlled masses of sound using a combination of home-grown, semi-algorithmic processes and intuition. Using traditional orchestral instruments, these works explore complexity and transformation of sound and form, instead of the traditional melody/harmony paradigm."

Modern Dance 
Zuckerman has worked with choreographer Benjamin Levy on Everyone, Intimate, Alone, Visibly, "in which extended vocal techniques performed and processed in real-time by Jeremy, intersect with Levy’s choreography to form a complex gestural dialog." He also worked with Levy on Khaos, which was commissioned by the Scottish Dance Theatre. Zuckerman created the score for dancer/choreographer Lisa Wahlander's The Impermanent Sky, which was composed and performed live by Zuckerman using the audio programming language SuperCollider.

Theatre 
Zuckerman composed the music to playwright Juli Crockett's theatre pieces [or, the whale], a spoken word opera which debuted in Los Angeles in 2001, and Orpheus Crawling, an experimental opera which premiered in 2007 at the New Original Works (NOW) Fest at REDCAT.

Discography 

Lucky (Original Motion Picture Soundtrack) (2021)
This Little Land of Mines (Original Motion Picture Soundtrack) (2019)
Beartrek (Original Motion Picture Soundtrack) (2019)
 Yosemite (From PBS’s "Nature") [Original Television Soundtrack] (2019)
 Snow Monkeys (From PBS’s "Nature") [Original Television Soundtrack] (2019)
 Scream: The TV Series Seasons 1 & 2 (Original Television Soundtrack) (2016)
 Khaos (2016) - dance score
 The Legend of Korra (Original Music from Book One) (2013)
 A Leading Man (Original Score) (2013 - with Benjamin Wynn)
 DC Showcase: Superman / Shazam! The Return of Black Adam (2011 - with Benjamin Wynn) - score soundtrack
 Egantic (2010) - Ginormous remix album. Tracks 1 and 4
 Diamond Dave (2003) - David Lee Roth album. Credits include: guitar, accordion, Fender Rhodes piano, Hammond B-3 organ, percussion, programming, engineer, producer, digital editing, sound design
 The Trailer Park Singles EP (2016) - Tommy MV$ERVTI extended play. Co-production (sampling) on track 1

Awards/Achievements 

2019 Doc LA Film Festival (won) - Best Composer(tie) for This little Land of Mines
2018 News & Documentary Emmy Awards (nominated) - Outstanding Music and Sound for Nature: Yosemite
 2017 Daytime Emmy Awards (nominated) - Outstanding Sound Editing (Music) for Kung Fu Panda: Legends of Awesomeness
 2015 Daytime Emmy Awards (won) - Outstanding Sound Editing (Music) for Kung Fu Panda: Legends of Awesomeness
 2015 News & Documentary Emmy Awards (nominated) - Outstanding Individual Achievement in a Craft: Music and Sound for Nature: Snow Monkeys
 2014 Daytime Emmy Awards (nominated) - Outstanding Sound Editing (Music) for Kung Fu Panda: Legends of Awesomeness
 2014 Playfest (Malaga, Spain) - Featured composer. Avatar: The Last Airbender and The Legend of Korra suites performed by orchestra and choir
 2013 Daytime Emmy Awards (nominated) - Outstanding Sound Editing (Music) for Kung Fu Panda: Legends of Awesomeness
 2013 GoldSpirit Awards (nominated) - Best TV Soundtrack for Legend of Korra (Original Music from Book One)
 2012 Daytime Emmy Awards (won) - Outstanding Sound Editing (Music) for Kung Fu Panda: Legends of Awesomeness
 2011 Motion Picture Sound Editors, USA  (nominated) - Best Sound Editing for DC Showcase: Jonah Hex
 2009 Motion Picture Sound Editors, USA (nominated) - Best Sound Editing for Avatar: The Last Airbender

See also
List of soundtrack composers

References

External links 

 Official website
 
 Listen
 Song Exploder: Episode 30
 Soundcloud

Living people
21st-century American composers
California Institute of the Arts alumni
Berklee College of Music alumni
1975 births